Uraz Kaygılaroğlu  (born 30 June 1987) is a Turkish actor and TV presenter. He is a graduate of Istanbul Bilgi University with a degree in commercials and advertising.

Career 
Kaygılaroğlu started his career in 2008. After he played a role in popular youth series "Es-Es", His breakthrough came in 2011 with a role in the Show TV teen comedy drama series Pis Yedili. He simultaneously joined the cast of Fox's comedy series Harem, portraying the character of Feminen Ağa. Between 2012-2017, He presented the contests "Sıra Sende Türkiye", "Kuyruk", "Ve Kazanan", "Takip", "Tam Zamanı" and "Kamuflaj". In 2013, he appeared in the TRT 1 series Eski Hikâye as Ömer.

In 2014, he was cast in the TRT 1 period drama Yedi Güzel Adam based life of poet "Adil Erdem Bayazıt". He returned comedy between 2015–2017, he starred with co-star ”Berna Koraltürk” in the comedy series Baba Candır as Haluk Güney . This role became phenomenon. He was praised by critics for drama and comedy success.

In 2017, he played the role of Kuzen Volki on Show TV's Klavye Delikanlıları series. In 2018, he was cast in the movie "Çakallarla Dans 5" as Kuzen Volki. In the same year, he starred in the drama series Masum Değiliz and Egenin Hamsisi. He played in film "Dede Korkut Hikayeleri: Bamsı Beyrek". It is written by Burak Aksak famous writer of hit surreal comedy Leyla ile Mecnun . The film isn't original story of Book of Dede Korkut. It is parody.

He played simultaneously in Star TV's drama series Sefirin Kızı and a leading role in short comedy series Aynen Aynen. He played leading role in crime series "Üç Kuruş". His comedy roles continues in franchise movies and web series.

Filmography
{| class="wikitable" style="font-size:90%"
|-
! colspan="3" style="background:LightSteelBlue" | Film 
|-
!style="background:#CCCCCC"| Title
!style="background:#CCCCCC"| Year
!style="background:#CCCCCC"| Role
|-
| Eltilerin Savaşı ||2020|| Fatih
|-
| Feride ||2020|| (minor role)
|-
| Karakomik Filmler ||2019|| Ethem
|-
|Çakallarla Dans 5||2018||Kuzen Volki (Sinan)
|-
|Sen Kiminle Dans Ediyorsun?||2017||Selim
|-
|Dede Korkut Hikayeleri: Salur Kazan - Zoraki Kahraman||2017||(voice)
|-
|Dede Korkut Hikayeleri: Bamsı Beyrek||2016||Bamsı Beyrek
|-
|Dönerse Senindir||2016||Kurt
|-
| Ejder Kapanı||2009||
|-
! colspan="3" style="background:LightSteelBlue" |Web series 
|-
!style="background:#CCCCCC"| Title
!style="background:#CCCCCC"| Year
!style="background:#CCCCCC"| Role
|-
|Avcı
|TBA
|
|-
|Erşan Kuneri||2022|| İbrahim Tumtum
|-
|Aşk 101||2021||Sinan (adult)
|-
|Ayak İşleri||2021||Guest
|-
|Aynen Aynen||2019||Emir
|-
! colspan="3" style="background:LightSteelBlue" | Tv series
|-
!style="background:#CCCCCC"| Title
!style="background:#CCCCCC"| Year
!style="background:#CCCCCC"| Role
|-
|Üç Kuruş||2021||Kartal Çaka
|-
|Sefirin Kızı||2019–2021||Gediz Işıklı
|-
|Ege'nin Hamsisi||2018|| Deniz Çınar
|-
|Masum Değiliz||2018||Mert
|-
|Klavye Delikanlı'ları ||2017||Volkan (Cousin Volki)
|-
|Heredot Cevdet Saati||2015|| rowspan="2"| Haluk Güney
|-
|Baba Candır||2015–2017
|-
|Yedi Güzel Adam||2014||Adil Erdem Bayazıt
|-
|Eski Hikâye||2013||Ömer
|-
|Harem||2012||Feminen Ağa
|-
|Pis Yedili||2011–2013||Canburger
|-
|Es Es||2009–2010|| Fethi
|-
|Canını Sevdiğiminin İstanbul'u||2009||Ferhat
|-
|Milyonda Bir||2008||Berke
|-
! colspan="3" style="background:LightSteelBlue" | Theatre 
|-
!style="background:#CCCCCC"| Title
!style="background:#CCCCCC"| Year
!style="background:#CCCCCC"| Role
|-
|Güldür Güldür Show|| || Guest
|-
! colspan="3" style="background:LightSteelBlue" | Short Film 
|-
!style="background:#CCCCCC"| Title
!style="background:#CCCCCC"| Year
!style="background:#CCCCCC"| Role
|-
|Nerde Kalmıştık||2009|| 
|-
|Mezuniyet (student project film)||2009||
|}

 TV programs 
  Sıra Sende Türkiye (2017)
  Kuyruk (2016)
  Ve Kazanan (2015)
  Takip (2014)
  Tam Zamanı (2013)
  Kamuflaj'' (2012)

References

External links 
 
 

1987 births
Living people
Male actors from Istanbul
Turkish male television actors
Turkish male film actors